The  Camera Museum is a privately owned museum in Istanbul, Turkey owned by Hilmi Nakipoğlu exhibiting cameras.

Established in 1997, the museum is located at Osmaniye Cad. 18B, Zihinsel Engelliler Okulu (School for Mental Disableds) Floor 4, Bakırköy, Istanbul. It 
features around 900 cameras of various type dated from 1896 to today and accessories.

See also
Camera Museum, Malatya

References

Photographic technology museums
Museums in Istanbul
Museums established in 1997
1997 establishments in Turkey
Bakırköy